Eucalyptus ignorabilis is a species of small to medium-sized tree that is endemic to southeastern Australia. It has rough, fibrous bark on the trunk and branches, lance-shaped to curved adult leaves, flower buds in groups of seven, white flowers and cup-shaped to hemispherical fruit. It is found in far southeastern New South Wales and eastern Victoria.

Description
It has rough, fibrous, spongy bark on the trunk and branches. Flowering has been recorded in January and April and the flowers are white. New taxa in Eucalyptus (Myrtaceae) |journal=Telopea |date=1991 |volume=4 |issue=2 |pages=242–243}}</ref>

Taxonomy and namingEucalyptus ignorabilis was first described in 1991 by Lawrie Johnson and Ken Hill from a specimen they collected near Seaton in 1986. The description was published in the journal Telopea. The specific epithet is from the Latin ignorabilis, 'unknown', referring to the previous inclusion of this species with E. aromaphloia''.

Distribution and habitat
This eucalypt grows in woodland in sandy soil in swampy areas south from the Nadgee Nature Reserve in New South Wales and sporadically as far west as Erica in Victoria.

References

ignorabilis
Myrtales of Australia
Flora of New South Wales
Trees of Australia
Plants described in 1991
Taxa named by Lawrence Alexander Sidney Johnson
Taxa named by Ken Hill (botanist)